Duleh Malal (also Romanized as Dūleh Malāl; also known as Dūlemalāl and Dyulamilan) is a village in Howmeh Rural District, in the Central District of Masal County, Gilan Province, Iran. At the 2006 census, its population was 826, in 204 families.

References 

Populated places in Masal County